Malango may refer to:

Malango language, a Southeast Solomonic language of Guadalcanal

People with the surname
Andrés Malango (born 1974), Equatoguinean footballer
Bernard Malango (born 1943), Zambian Anglican priest